The 2016–17 Rain or Shine Elasto Painters season was the 11th season of the franchise in the Philippine Basketball Association (PBA).

Key dates
October 30: The 2016 PBA draft took place at Midtown Atrium, Robinson Place Manila.

Draft picks

Special draft

Regular draft
Rain or Shine passed in the regular draft. They originally owned one second round and three third round picks.

Roster

Philippine Cup

Eliminations

Standings

Game log

|- style="background:#cfc;"
| 1
| November 23
| TNT
| W 101–87
| Jericho Cruz (18)
| Raymond Almazan (12)
| seven players (2)
| Smart Araneta Coliseum
| 1–0
|- style="background:#cfc;"
| 2
| November 30
| Mahindra
| W 105–83
| Jericho Cruz (15)
| Beau Belga (8)
| Ahanmisi, Cruz, Maiquez (4)
| Ynares Center
| 2–0

|- style="background:#fcc;"
| 3
| December 4
| Barangay Ginebra
| L 74–81
| Raymond Almazan (13)
| Jay Washington (17)
| Ahanmisi, Belga (3)
| Smart Araneta Coliseum
| 2–1
|- style="background:#cfc;"
| 4
| December 9
| Blackwater
| W 107–93
| James Yap (15)
| Raymond Almazan (16)
| Beau Belga (5)
| Smart Araneta Coliseum
| 3–1
|- style="background:#fcc;"
| 5
| December 18
| Star
| L 91–99
| Raymond Almazan (19)
| Raymond Almazan (13)
| Jeff Chan (5)
| Smart Araneta Coliseum
| 3–2
|- style="background:#cfc;"
| 6
| December 23
| NLEX
| W 107–97
| Jewel Ponferada (22)
| Belga, Ponferada (9)
| Maverick Ahanmisi (7)
| PhilSports Arena
| 4–2

|- style="background:#cfc;"
| 7
| January 8
| Phoenix
| W 97–82
| Jericho Cruz (21)
| Jay Washington (11)
| Beau Belga (4)
| Smart Araneta Coliseum
| 5–2
|- style="background:#fcc;"
| 8
| January 13
| San Miguel
| L 101–107 (OT)
| Beau Belga (14)
| Jay Washington (6)
| Ahanmisi, Norwood (6)
| Mall of Asia Arena
| 5–3
|- style="background:#fcc;"
| 9
| January 20
| Meralco
| L 72–82
| James Yap (17)
| Gabe Norwood (8)
| Gabe Norwood (4)
| Cuneta Astrodome
| 5–4
|- style="background:#fcc;"
| 10
| January 29
| GlobalPort
| L 99–117
| Jeff Chan (26)
| Belga, Ponferada (9)
| Beau Belga (5)
| Cuneta Astrodome
| 5–5

|- style="background:#fcc;"
| 11
| February 1
| Alaska
| L 89–94
| Norwood, Yap (16)
| Belga, Norwood (8)
| Chan, Cruz (4)
| Cuneta Astrodome
| 5–6

Playoffs

Bracket

Game log

|- style="background:#cfc;"
| 1
| February 3
| Blackwater
| W 103–80
| Jay Washington (15)
| Cruz (12)
| Jeff Chan (6)
| Smart Araneta Coliseum
| 1–0

|- style="background:#fcc;"
| 1
| February 5
| San Miguel
| L 91–98
| Beau Belga (18)
| Norwood, Washington (8)
| Jeff Chan (4)
| Ynares Center
| 0–1

Commissioner's Cup

Eliminations

Standings

Game log

|- style="background:#cfc;"
| 1
| March 17
| NLEX
| W 113–105
| James Yap (26)
| Shawn Taggart (10)
| Belga, Taggart (4)
| Smart Araneta Coliseum
| 1–0
|- style="background:#cfc;"
| 2
| March 19
| Mahindra
| W 99–95 (OT)
| Shawn Taggart (29)
| Belga, Taggart (10)
| Ahanmisi, Taggart (4)
| Smart Araneta Coliseum
| 2–0
|- style="background:#cfc;"
| 3
| March 26
| Blackwater
| W 95–88
| Shawn Taggart (26)
| Shawn Taggart (12)
| Belga, Cruz (4)
| Ynares Center
| 3–0
|- style="background:#fcc;"
| 4
| March 31
| Meralco
| L 83–89
| Shawn Taggart (27)
| Shawn Taggart (13)
| Chris Tiu (3)
| Mall of Asia Arena
| 3–1

|- style="background:#fcc;"
| 5
| April 2
| Alaska
| L 102–105
| Shawn Taggart (40)
| Shawn Taggart (14)
| Jeff Chan (5)
| Smart Araneta Coliseum
| 3–2
|- style="background:#cfc;"
| 6
| April 12
| Phoenix
| W 96–94
| Jeff Chan (24)
| Shawn Taggart (17)
| Shawn Taggart (5)
| Smart Araneta Coliseum
| 4–2
|- style="background:#fcc;"
| 7
| April 22
| San Miguel
| L 98–111
| Shawn Taggart (24)
| Shawn Taggart (10)
| four players (3)
| Mall of Asia Arena
| 4–3
|- align="center"
|colspan="9" bgcolor="#bbcaff"|All-Star Break

|- style="background:#fcc;"
| 8
| May 6
| Star
| L 93–99
| Chan, Taggart (20)
| Jay Washington (11)
| four players (2)
| Batangas City Coliseum
| 4–4
|- style="background:#cfc;"
| 9
| May 19
| Barangay Ginebra
| W 118–112
| Duke Crews (28)
| Duke Crews (22)
| Jeff Chan (4)
| Cuneta Astrodome
| 5–4
|- style="background:#fcc;"
| 10
| May 26
| GlobalPort
| L 101–107
| Duke Crews (23)
| Duke Crews (17)
| Jericho Cruz (6)
| Alonte Sports Arena
| 5–5
|- style="background:#fcc;"
| 11
| May 28
| TNT
| L 102–105
| James Yap (23)
| Duke Crews (17)
| Belga, Cruz (3)
| Ynares Center
| 5–6

Playoffs

Bracket

Game log

|- style="background:#fcc;" 
| 1 
| June 5 
| Star
| L 82–118
| Duke Crews (19)
| Duke Crews (13)
| Mike Tolomia (5)
| Smart Araneta Coliseum 
| 0–1
|- style="background:#fcc;" 
| 2
| June 7 
| Star
| L 69–84
| Duke Crews (12)
| Beau Belga (6)
| Maverick Ahanmisi (4)
| Smart Araneta Coliseum 
| 0–2

Governors' Cup

Eliminations

Standings

Game log

|- style="background:#cfc;"
| 1
| July 21
| GlobalPort
| W 98–96
| J.D. Weatherspoon (25)
| J.D. Weatherspoon (15)
| Maverick Ahanmisi (4)
| Smart Araneta Coliseum
| 1–0
|- style="background:#fcc;"
| 2
| July 26
| NLEX
| L 114–122 (2OT)
| J.D. Weatherspoon (20)
| J.D. Weatherspoon (16)
| Maverick Ahanmisi (7)
| Smart Araneta Coliseum
| 1–1
|- style="background:#fcc;"
| 3
| July 29
| Meralco
| L 73–89
| J.D. Weatherspoon (19)
| J.D. Weatherspoon (13)
| Maverick Ahanmisi (3)
| Ynares Center
| 1–2

|- style="background:#cfc;"
| 4
| August 13
| Kia
| W 94–86
| J'Nathan Bullock (20)
| J'Nathan Bullock (10)
| Chris Tiu (8)
| Mall of Asia Arena
| 2–2
|- style="background:#cfc;"
| 5
| August 20
| TNT
| W 105–73
| J'Nathan Bullock (20)
| J'Nathan Bullock (14)
| Chris Tiu (6)
| Smart Araneta Coliseum
| 3–2
|- style="background:#cfc;"
| 6
| August 27
| Star
| W 92–88
| Bullock, Cruz (18)
| Raymond Almazan (14)
| J'Nathan Bullock (5)
| Smart Araneta Coliseum
| 4–2

|- style="background:#fcc;" 
| 7
| September 6
| San Miguel 
| L 96–103
| J'Nathan Bullock (22)
| J'Nathan Bullock (13)
| J'Nathan Bullock (17)
| Smart Araneta Coliseum 
| 4–3
|- style="background:#cfc;" 
| 8
| September 13
| Phoenix 
| W 116–111
| J'Nathan Bullock (33)
| Raymond Almazan (11)
| Maverick Ahanmisi (9)
| Ynares Center 
| 5–3
|- style="background:#fcc;" 
| 9
| September 16
| Barangay Ginebra 
| L 82–89
| Raymond Almazan (20)
| J'Nathan Bullock (11)
| Beau Belga (7)
| Mall of Asia Arena 
| 5–4
|- style="background:#cfc;" 
| 10
| September 20
| Alaska
| W 112–82
| J'Nathan Bullock (14)
| Norwood, Tiu (8)
| Chris Tiu (5)
| Ynares Center 
| 6–4
|- style="background:#cfc;" 
| 11
| September 23
| Blackwater
| W 122–98
| J'Nathan Bullock (30)
| Maverick Ahanmisi (9)
| three players (5)
| Smart Araneta Coliseum 
| 7–4

Playoffs

Bracket

Game log

|- style="background:#cfc;"
| 1
| September 27
| TNT
| W 106–102
| J'Nathan Bullock (31)
| J'Nathan Bullock (15)
| Gabe Norwood (6)
| Mall of Asia Arena
| 1–0
|- style="background:#fcc;"
| 2
| September 29
| TNT
| L 114–118
| J'Nathan Bullock (30)
| Maverick Ahanmisi (12)
| Maverick Ahanmisi (8)
| Smart Araneta Coliseum
| 1–1

Transactions

Free agency

Trades
Off-season

Philippine Cup

Governors' Cup

Recruited imports

Awards

References

Rain or Shine Elasto Painters seasons
Rain Or Shine Elasto Painters season